Chaloem Phra Kiat is a district (amphoe) in the eastern part of Nakhon Ratchasima province, northeastern Thailand.

History
Five tambons were separated from Chakkarat district to create the new district on 5 December 1996. It was one of five districts named Chaloem Phra Kiat created on the same date to commemorate the 50th anniversary of the ascension to the throne of King Bhumibol Adulyadej (Rama IX).

Geography
Neighbouring districts are (from the north clockwise): Non Sung, Chakkarat, Chok Chai and Mueang Nakhon Ratchasima.

Administration
The district is divided into five subdistricts (tambons). The township (thesaban tambon) of Tha Chang covers parts of tambons Tha Chang and Chang Thong.

See also
Nakhon Ratchasima Airport

References

External links
amphoe.com

Chaloem Phra Kiat